Isaac Gómez may refer to:

Isi (footballer, born October 1995), Spanish footballer
Isaac Gómez (sprinter) (born 1934), Filipino sprinter
Isaac Gómez (runner) (born 1976), Mexican distance runner